During the 1970–71 English football season, Brentford competed in the Football League Fourth Division. A forgettable league season was chiefly remembered for a run to the fifth round of the FA Cup, the furthest the Bees had progressed in the competition since 1948–49.

Season summary 
After taking over halfway through an encouraging 1969–70 season, Brentford manager Frank Blunstone went into the 1970–71 Fourth Division season with the belief that the club would be able to finish one place higher and gain automatic promotion. Five players were released (including ageing defensive stalwarts Tommy Higginson and Allan Jones) and three were transferred in – midfielder Jackie Graham from Guildford City, utility player Paul Bence from Brighton & Hove Albion and Chelsea youth defender Michael Maskell. Due to financial constraints, Blunstone's squad was limited to just 16 players for the fourth consecutive season, but the youth team was reactivated after being disbanded due to budget cuts in 1967.

A failure to win any of the opening 9 matches of the season in all competitions set a new post-war club record. The loan signing of former Busby Babe Alex Dawson from Brighton & Hove Albion in September 1970 helped improve matters, with the forward scoring 7 goals in 11 appearances and inspiring a five-match winning streak in October and November. Frustratingly, a £7,000 deal to buy him fell through and he left the club after his loan expired. While the team slowly pulled itself away from the relegation zone and finished comfortably in mid-table, the FA Cup gradually became the main focus of the season.

Third Division clubs Gillingham Walsall were beaten in the second round, but the third round draw failed to produce a money-spininng tie and instead an away trip to fellow Fourth Division club Workington. A John Docherty goal was enough to see off Workington and the fourth round draw produced another away tie, this time to Second Division club Cardiff City. Over 23,000 watched Brentford run out 2–0 winners at Ninian Park, courtesy of goals from Jackie Graham and John Docherty. Brentford also faced Second Division opponents in the fifth round, Hull City. Victory would have made Brentford the second Fourth Division club to reach the last-eight of the FA Cup. Brentford took the lead through Bobby Ross at Boothferry Park, but two late goals from the Tigers ended the Bees' run.

Significantly for the long-term future of Brentford, the FA Cup run generated £8,000, which helped boost the profit on the season to £20,000 and enabled the final instalment of the club's 1967 £104,000 loan (equivalent to £ in ) to be paid off. A 6–4 victory over York City on 9 November 1970 equalled the club record for highest aggregate score in a Football League match.

League table

Results
Brentford's goal tally listed first.

Legend

Pre-season and friendlies

Football League Fourth Division

FA Cup

Football League Cup 

 Sources: The Big Brentford Book of the Seventies, Statto

Playing squad 
Players' ages are as of the opening day of the 1970–71 season.

 Sources: The Big Brentford Book of the Seventies, Timeless Bees

Coaching staff

Statistics

Appearances and goals
Substitute appearances in brackets.

Players listed in italics left the club mid-season.
Source: 100 Years of Brentford

Goalscorers 

Players listed in italics left the club mid-season.
Source: 100 Years of Brentford

Management

Summary

Transfers & loans

Awards 
 Supporters' Player of the Year: Bobby Ross
 Players' Player of the Year: Alan Nelmes

Notes

References 

Brentford F.C. seasons
Brentford